My Afternoons with Margueritte (French: La Tête en friche) is a 2010 French film directed by Jean Becker, based on the book of the same name by Marie-Sabine Roger. It stars Gérard Depardieu, Gisèle Casadesus, Claire Maurier, Maurane, and François-Xavier Demaison. The film tells the story of an illiterate man who bonds with an older, well-read woman.

Plot

Germain is a 45-year-old, illiterate handyman. As a child, he was bullied at school for being a slow reader, by both the teachers and other students. His mother kept reminding him that he was clumsy and an unwanted child, and did not give him much love. He is a loyal man, with a good heart. He lives in a trailer he parks close to his mother's house, where he cultivates a vegetable garden. He earns some extra money by selling his vegetables at the weekly farmers' market, borrowing a truck from the bar where he is a regular customer with his friends. His girl friend Annette is a younger woman who drives the local bus; she truly loves this sweet, simple and loving man.

One afternoon Germain meets Margueritte, a delicate, 95-year-old woman who sits on the same bench with him to feed pigeons. He has observed the 19 birds so often that he knows each and has named them. He sees that she is highly educated, and learns she had worked as a scientist with the World Health Organization. She lives in a retirement home in the village and reads frequently. They connect over a text from The Plague by Albert Camus. Because  Germain is barely literate, Margueritte starts to read the book aloud to him. Slowly he starts to appreciate the beauty of words and sentences, because he is a good listener and he has a vivid imagination. Germain is affected by the symbolism Camus uses in this philosophical novel, expanding his horizons. The pair meet every day to continue their reading sessions. A friendship develops. Margueritte eventually gives him her old dictionary. In it he tries to find words that he's interested in, but because he can't spell, he finds the dictionary too frustrating. He decides to return it when Margueritte invites him to her place for tea.

She tells him that her eyesight is gradually fading, and that she will soon no longer be able to walk unassisted. Germain decides to reverse roles and try to read to her, but first he must improve his reading skills. With Annette's support he learns to read a story aloud to Margueritte. Shortly thereafter, Germain finds his mother dead at home, and is distraught.

At the notary, he learns that his mother owned her house, which he had thought she rented. She had accumulated a  sizeable fortune from strict saving, and always intended to bequeath that to him, but had never told him. Meanwhile, Annette announces she is pregnant. Germain had hesitated to have children, believing he could not offer them enough. Annette tells him not to worry: he can give love. When Margueritte is forced to leave her retirement home for a lesser one in Flanders, she puts aside her dictionary for Germain. He traces her down and brings her back to live with him at his mother's house. On their return, he reads her a poem written for her.

Cast
 Gérard Depardieu as Germain Chazes
 Gisèle Casadesus as Margueritte
 Claire Maurier as Jacqueline
 Maurane as Francine
 François-Xavier Demaison as Gardini
 Anne Le Guernec as Jacqueline
 Amandine Chauveau as Jacqueline
 Sophie Guillemin as Annette
 Florian Yven as Germain
 Patrick Bouchitey as Landremont
 Régis Laspalès as M. Bayle
 Jean-François Stévenin as Joseph
 Lyes Salem as Youssef
 Matthieu Dahan as Julien
 Bruno Ricci as Marco
 Mélanie Bernier as Stéphanie

Reception
On review aggregator website Rotten Tomatoes, the film holds an approval rating of 85% based on 60 reviews, and an average rating of 6.4/10. The website's critical consensus reads, "It's sentimental and treacly, but that's not enough to prevent My Afternoons with Margueritte from being truly affecting." On Metacritic, the film has a weighted average score of 59 out of 100, based on 16 critics, indicating "mixed or average reviews".

References

External links
 
 "1900," C. J. (n.d.). 玛格丽特午后的小诗  Poem read in My Afternoons with Margueritte.

2010s French-language films
Films directed by Jean Becker
French comedy-drama films
2010 comedy-drama films
2010 films
Films based on French novels
Films with screenplays by Jean-Loup Dabadie
2010s French films